Annabella's Adventure or The Adventure of Annabella (Italian:L'avventura di Annabella) is a 1943 Italian comedy film directed by Leo Menardi and starring Fioretta Dolfi, Maurizio D'Ancora and Paola Borboni.

The film's sets were designed by the art director Virgilio Marchi.

Cast
 Fioretta Dolfi as Annabella  
 Maurizio D'Ancora as Roberto 
 Paola Borboni as La madre di Annabella  
 Enrico Viarisio as Il padre di Annabella  
 Amelia Chellini as La madre di Roberto 
 Virgilio Riento as Il padre di Roberto  
 Cesco Baseggio as Lo zio di Roberto  
 Anna Magnani as La mondana
 Guido Barbarisi 
 Galeazzo Benti 
 
 Gorella Gori 
 Alfredo Martinelli
  
 Giacomo Moschini 
 Stefano Sibaldi

References

Bibliography 
 Moliterno, Gino. The A to Z of Italian Cinema. Scarecrow Press, 2009.

External links 
 

1943 films
1943 comedy films
Italian comedy films
1940s Italian-language films
Films directed by Leo Menardi
Italian black-and-white films
1940s Italian films